"I Came 2 Party" is a song by German band Cinema Bizarre. It features Space Cowboy and was written and produced by Martin Kierszenbaum, RedOne and Space Cowboy, for the band's second studio album ToyZ (2009) and debut U.S. album, BANG!. The track was released as the album's lead single on August 7, 2009 throughout German-speaking Europe and on August 11, 2009 worldwide. The song is also included on Space Cowboy's fourth studio album, Digital Rock Star. The Paradiso Girls version of the song was also featured in the "San Vicente" episode of TV series Melrose Place.

Track listing
These are the formats and track listings of major single releases of "I Came 2 Party".

U.S. Digital Download
"I Came 2 Party" – 3:27

CD maxi
"I Came 2 Party" – 3:27
"I Came 2 Party" (Michael Mind remix) – 5:37
"I Came 2 Party" (mobile edit) – 0:47

2-Track CD single
"I Came 2 Party" – 3:27
"I Came 2 Party" (Michael Mind Remix) – 5:37

Digital EP
"I Came 2 Party" – 3:27
"I Came 2 Party" (Michael Mind remix) – 5:37
"I Came 2 Party" (T.Raumschmiere remix) - 7:04
"I Came 2 Party" (mobile edit) – 0:47

Credits and personnel
Strify:— Vocals,
Space Cowboy:— producer, vocals, writer
Kiro:— bass
Yu:— guitarist
Shin:— drums
Romeo:— keyboard

Remixes and other versions 
Cinema Bizarre
"I Came 2 Party" (album version) – 3:27
"I Came 2 Party" (video version) - 3:38
"I Came 2 Party" (Michael Mind remix) – 5:37
"I Came 2 Party" (T.Raumschmiere remix) - 7:04
"I Came 2 Party" (Jump Smokers remix) – 3:36
"I Came 2 Party" (mobile edit) – 0:47

Paradiso Girls
"I Came 2 Party" (album version) – 3:36
"I Came 2 Party" (DJ Dan radio edit) – 3:27
"I Came 2 Party" (DJ Dan club mix) – 6:24
"I Came 2 Party" (Starkillers remix) – 7:46
"I Came 2 Party" (Jump Smokers remix) – 3:36
"I Came 2 Party" (Jump Smokers dub) – 3:36
"I Came 2 Party" (Discotech remix) – 4:30
"I Came 2 Party" (David Garcia remix) – 5:07

Charts

Release history

References

2009 singles
Cinema Bizarre songs
Space Cowboy (musician) songs
Songs written by RedOne
Songs written by Martin Kierszenbaum
2009 songs
Island Records singles
Song recordings produced by RedOne